Scarlet Days is a 1919 American silent Western film produced and directed by D. W. Griffith and released through Paramount/Artcraft Pictures, Artcraft being an affiliate of Paramount. Richard Barthelmess stars in a role for which Griffith had screentested Rudolph Valentino. In today's time, this film is considered by many to be one of Griffith's worst films though it might have worked better as a short film. This film was unlike others created by D.W. Griffith. According to an article written for The Cincinnati Enquirer, written on the 16 of November 1919: "Unlike other recent Griffith production, Scarlet Days is a story of the old West, of the gold rush days of 49- Bret Harte transferred to the screen!" The Western film genre was expanding at this time and Scarlet Days fits into this category. Western films were popular for this time.

Considered a lost film, a print was found in the State Film Archives of the Soviet Union, which donated it to the Museum of Modern Art in 1969. The film was screened to the public, for the first time since its rediscovery, on March 24 and 25, 1969. Scarlet Days was shown alongside another missing film, A Romance of Happy Valley, at the Museum of Modern Art's auditorium with titles still printed in Russian. English titles were later created by the Department of Film at the Museum of Modern Art.

Plot
As described in a film magazine, Rosie Nell (Besserer), a woman of dance halls in early lawless California, is wrongly charged with the murder of one of her fellow entertainers. Because her daughter (Dempster), who knows nothing of her mother's station in life, is to return the next day from her school in the east, Rosie is granted three days of grace to be spent in company with her daughter at a nearby cabin. The three days pass happily, but King Bagley (Long), manager of the dance hall, has seen the daughter and determined to make her his own. The women barricade themselves in the cabin to resist capture and Alvarez (Barthelmess), a young outlaw with considerable local prestige, comes to their assistance. John Randolph (Graves), who also loves the young woman, joins the fight on their side, which ends with the timely arrival of the Sheriff (Fawcett). This results in a happy ending.

Cast
 Richard Barthelmess as Alvarez
 Eugenie Besserer as Rosie Nell
 Carol Dempster as Lady Fair
 Clarine Seymour as Chiquita
 Ralph Graves as Randolph
 George Fawcett as The Sheriff
 Walter Long as King Bagley
 Kate Bruce as Aunt
 Rhea Haines as Spasm Sal
 Adolph Lestina as Randolph's Friend
 Herbert Sutch as The Second Sheriff
 J. Wesley Warner as Alvarez's Man

Release

Responses 
Public response to this film was overwhelmingly positive during its release in November 1919. Many news sources in 1919 published review articles complimenting and comparing Scarlet Days to other films created by D.W.Griffith. News outlets such as the "New-York Tribune", "San Francisco Chronicle", "Cincinnati Enquirer", and more were including reviews on Scarlet Days as well as announcing local showtimes for this film. A review article from the "Cincinnati Enquirer" stated that: "The latest D.W. Griffith production soon will be ready for local release. Griffith as usual has assembled a sparkling cast for his new picture." Scarlet Days traveled across the country to show in various theaters after its release date on November 9, 1919. Prior to the actual showing, news articles would be released to inform readers of short plot summaries and events in the production.

On an opposing view written for "Variety" magazine wrote on Scarlet Days negatively, and claimed that: "Scarlet Days as a story was not worthy of Griffith's direction in picturization. It is entire too commonplace." For current day moviegoers, this film is one of the least popular of D.W. Griffith's directed pictures. Scarlet Days was considered to be made too late in the era where Western films were becoming popular. Though some new sources gave positive feedback in response to the release of this film, opposing viewpoints claimed that: "Outside of [the lack of plot depth] there is nothing more to say except that it is a surprise that Griffith should at this late date take to filming rip-snorting Western mellers with a lot of harum-scarum rough stuff with gunplay."

References

External links

 
 Scarlet Days ; AllMovie/synopsis
 Scarlet Days free download at Internet Archive
 Lobby poster
 Film stills at silenthollywood.com
 DVD availability at Oldies.com and Grapevine Video

1919 films
1919 Western (genre) films
Films directed by D. W. Griffith
American black-and-white films
1910s rediscovered films
Rediscovered American films
Silent American Western (genre) films
1910s American films